The Astoria–Ditmars Boulevard station (also known as Ditmars Boulevard station), is the northern terminal station on the BMT Astoria Line of the New York City Subway. Located above 31st Street between 23rd Avenue and Ditmars Boulevard in Astoria and Ditmars, Queens, it is served by the N train at all times and the W train on weekdays.

The Astoria–Ditmars Boulevard station opened on February 1, 1917, as part of the initial segment of the BMT Astoria Line. In 2018 and 2019, this station was renovated along with six others on the Astoria Line.

This station has two tracks and an island platform. It is partially under the New York Connecting Railroad (NYCR) viaduct, which also carries the tracks of Amtrak's Northeast Corridor. Most of the platform is north of the viaduct.

History

Opening 

This station opened on February 1, 1917, along with the rest of the Astoria Line, which was originally part of the IRT, as a spur off the IRT Queensboro Line, now the IRT Flushing Line. Trains ran between Grand Central and Astoria. Dignitaries from the first ride included President of Alderman Frank Dowling, Public Service Commissioner Hodges, numerous other officials of the commission, President Shonts of the IRT, with a number of his assistants, and Queens Borough President Connolly. Members of the PSC pointed out the need to extend the line from the terminal to Ditmars Boulevard and Steinway Street. Regular passenger service started that afternoon. The station's name was originally Ditmars Avenue, which was the name of Ditmars Boulevard at the station's opening.

On July 23, 1917, the Queensboro Bridge spur of the elevated IRT Second Avenue Line opened. At that time, all elevated trains to Queensboro Plaza used the Astoria Line while all subway trains used the Corona Line, though this was later changed with trains alternating between branches. This station started to be served by BMT shuttles using elevated cars on April 8, 1923.

The city government took over the BMT's operations on June 1, 1940, and the IRT's operations on June 12, 1940. On October 17, 1949, the Astoria Line became BMT-only as the tracks at Queensboro Plaza were consolidated and the platforms on the Astoria Line were shaved back to allow through BMT trains to operate on it. Service was initially provided by the Brighton Local (BMT 1) weekdays & Broadway - Fourth Avenue Local (BMT 2) at all times.

Renovations 
In 1981, the MTA listed the station among the 69 most deteriorated stations in the subway system. In February 2018, the MTA announced that the station would be renovated for 14 months beginning in April of that year, as part of a $22 million project. The station house, mezzanine, and stairs would be repaired. Some residents protested, arguing that the renovated station would lack elevators, and that then-ongoing full closures of the 30th Avenue and 36th Avenue stations in Astoria had negatively impacted the community.

Station layout

This station has two tracks and an island platform. It is partially located under the New York Connecting Railroad (NYCR) viaduct. Most of the platform is north of the viaduct. The platform canopy extends to the portion of the platform under the NYCR. The tracks end at bumper blocks at the north end of the platform.

The 2018 artwork at this station is Urban Idyll by painter Elisabeth Condon. It consists of laminated glass windows with a Tree of Life theme.

Exits
The station's only mezzanine is a station house beneath the tracks and platforms. Two double-wide staircases from the platform go down to their own bank of turnstiles with a token booth in the middle. Outside fare control, there are four staircases, two going down to the west side of 31st Street between Ditmars Boulevard and 23rd Avenue and two going down to the east side. The east side of the station house has a short, enclosed pedestrian bridge that leads to the Ditmars Plaza Mini Mall, located on the second floor of the adjacent Garry Building. This mall has a staircase to the street, providing another entrance to the station.

Provisions for proposed extensions

There was a proposed, but never-built, extension of the line toward Bayside and possibly LaGuardia Airport.
In 1998, an extension of the BMT Astoria Line to LaGuardia Airport was planned as part of a $1.2 billion package to provide access to the New York City airports with funding from the MTA, the Port Authority and the city. The preferred route would have extended the Astoria Line along 31st Street north onto Con Edison’s property at the edge of Astoria and then east along 19th Avenue to the Marine Air Terminal. The MTA also considered an eastward extension along Ditmars Boulevard, and a plan to reroute LaGuardia-bound trains from Queensboro Plaza through the Sunnyside rail yard and along the eastern edge of St. Michael’s Cemetery to elevated tracks parallel to the Grand Central Parkway. A fourth route was to have trains turn east via Astoria Boulevard. All of the options would have new elevated sections built. $645 million for the LaGuardia extension was included in the MTA’s 2000-2004 Five-Year Capital Plan, and in late 2002, Mayor Bloomberg supported the extension. These options were studied in the LaGuardia Airport Subway Access Study. Community opposition was strong and therefore the plan was canceled in July 2003. After the AirTrain LaGuardia people mover, which would have run to Mets–Willets Point, was canceled in 2023, a panel of three transportation experts recommended that the Port Authority of New York and New Jersey operate a shuttle bus route from the airport to the Astoria–Ditmars Boulevard station.

The Regional Plan Association, in its Fourth Plan in 2017, anticipated that the population of Astoria would quickly grow over the next three decades, and so called for the Astoria Line to be extended to a new storage yard at Ditmars Boulevard and 20th Street, which would provide added capacity. In addition, a new station at 21st Avenue and 20th Street would improve access for the currently underserved but dense northwest parts of Astoria.

Ridership 
In 2019, the station had 5,277,341 boardings, making it the 120th most used station in the -station system. This amounted to an average of 17,912 passengers per weekday.

Image gallery

References

External links 

 
 Station Reporter — N Train
 TheSubwayNut - Astoria-Ditmars Boulevard
 Ditmars Boulevard entrance from Google Maps Street View
 Platform from Google Maps Street View

BMT Astoria Line stations
New York City Subway stations in Queens, New York
New York City Subway terminals
Railway stations in the United States opened in 1917
Astoria, Queens
1917 establishments in New York City